"What Are We Going to Do with Uncle Arthur?" is a song featured in the 1970s television series Upstairs, Downstairs. It was written by Alexander Faris and Alfred Shaughnessy. Faris had also written the instrumental theme tune for the series. Shaughnessy wrote and edited scripts for the series.

The song is a mildly bawdy music hall number performed by the character Sarah Moffat (played by Pauline Collins). Her performance of the song in the episode "For Love of Love" draws the interest of James Bellamy, leading to a dramatic subplot within the ongoing story of the Bellamys.

A lively instrumental version of the song was played over the closing credits of each program in the series.

External links
Songs of Upstairs, Downstairs

1973 songs
Television drama theme songs
Songs about families
Songs about fictional male characters
Upstairs, Downstairs